State Route 566 (SR 566) is a north–south state highway in eastern Ohio, a U.S. state.

Route description
SR 566 begins at a T-intersection with SR 147 north of Mount Ephraim. Heading northwest from this intersection, the route passes through Seneca Township amid a blend of woods and open fields, and passing the occasional residence. A series of spur gravel roadways split off from the state highway in this stretch to provide connections to additional area residences. SR 566 then arrives at its junction with SR 574, a T-intersection that serves as the intersecting state route's southern terminus.

From the SR 574 intersection, SR 566 turns more to the west-northwest, and is abutted by open fields on both sides of the roadway. The highway bends back to the northwest, and crosses into Wayne Township. With some patches of trees lining up along the roadway amid the open space, SR 566 passes the Township Road 120 intersection, then turns to the north. The state highway then bends back to the northwest, is briefly brushed up against by woods on both sides. and re-enters open farmland just before turning to the west, and arriving at its endpoint at a T-intersection with SR 285 south of the village of Senecaville.

No portion of SR 566 is included within the National Highway System.

History
Since first being designated in 1937, SR 566 has maintained the same routing between SR 147 and SR 285 that it does today. No changes of major significance have taken place to SR 566 since its creation.

Major intersections

References

566
Transportation in Noble County, Ohio